The Libertarian Party of South Dakota is the South Dakota affiliate of the national Libertarian Party.

Background 

The Libertarian Party of South Dakota aims to promote Libertarian policies and support Libertarian candidates throughout the state. According to the secretary of state's office, there were approximately 1,930 registered Libertarian voters in South Dakota as of April 2020.

In 2006, South Dakota's Libertarian nominees for governor and attorney general received 1.0 percent and 2.7 percent of the vote respectively. In 2012, the Libertarian nominee for public utilities commissioner received 5.7 percent. During the 2014 election cycle, the party nominated Libertarian candidates to challenge unopposed Republican candidates in three statewide races. Chad Haber, the 2014 Libertarian nominee for attorney general, received 18.0 percent of the vote. Kurt Evans, the party's 2014 nominee for state auditor, received 20.1 percent, and John English, the 2014 nominee for commissioner of school and public lands, received 23.5 percent.

In the 2020 United States House of Representatives elections, Libertarian candidate Randy Luallin won 19 percent of the vote statewide, including winning the majority of the votes in two counties.

References

External links
 Libertarian Party of South Dakota (official website)

South Dakota
Political parties in South Dakota